Chinchillani (Aymara chinchilla a kind of rodent, -ni a suffix, "the one with the chinchillas) is a mountain in the Andes of Bolivia which reaches a height of approximately . It is located in the La Paz Department, Pacajes Province, Calacoto Municipality. It is southwest of Suni Q'awa and northwest of Ch'uxña Quta.

References 

Mountains of La Paz Department (Bolivia)